Rivetina crassa is a species of praying mantis in the family Rivetinidae.

See also
List of mantis genera and species

References

C
Insects described in 1949